Euphorbia florida, the Chiricahua milk spurge or Chiricahua Mountain sandmat, is an annual plant in the spurge family (Euphorbiaceae) found in the Sonoran Desert of the mountains of southern Arizona and north-western Mexico.

References

florida
Flora of the Sonoran Deserts
Flora of Arizona
Flora of Northwestern Mexico
Flora of Sonora
Plants described in 1859